GHGProof is an open-source model designed to evaluate the impacts of land-use decisions on greenhouse gas emissions and energy consumption at the community scale. It has been developed by Sustainability Solutions Group, a Canadian workers co-operative, and has been widely used in British Columbia since 2008, with regular revisions and updates from SSG's GHGProof pages. Reviews of GHGProof and comparison to other modelling platforms may be found in references.

History 

GHGProof was first conceived in a project designed to evaluate the impact of a land-use plan on Salt Spring Island in BC, commissioned by the Islands Trust. Following this project, SSG was awarded a research grant from CMHC and worked with the Fraser Valley Regional District to develop an open source model for wide distribution. GHGProof was piloted with the City of Abbotsford and the Town of Hope, and baseline GHG inventories were created for a workshop with all the FVRD municipalities in which they could develop scenarios. The Government of BC requires that all municipalities include GHG targets in their official community plans, creating an incentive for this type of modelling. An article in Municipal World describes the use of the model in the FVRD.

Architecture 

GHGProof consists of two components. The first component is a series of analysis in GIS that analyse travel behaviour, building distribution and forest and agricultural areas for a community. The second component is an excel spreadsheet that takes inputs from the GIS analysis and uses a series of calculations to generate GHG emissions, energy use and energy costs for a community. For a detailed summary on the structure of the model see the GHGProof Guidebook. Interactive skins have been placed over the model to facilitate community engagement.

Scope 

GHGProof includes GHG emissions and reductions from public and private transportation, mode shifting to walking and cycling, commercial transportation, private dwellings, commercial buildings, embodied carbon from road construction, district energy, agricultural practices, liquid and solid waste, food miles (transportation of food), forest area and forest practices. New parameters are added periodically.

Outputs of the model include total GHG emissions, per capita GHG emissions, reductions by type, energy use by type, vehicle kilometres travelled, mode share, $ savings from energy, $ of investment, jobs created and marginal abatement cost.

Uses 

GHGProof has been used by communities to evaluate land-use planning decisions including to develop an achievable GHG target, develop a realistic strategy to achieve a target, evaluate a large-scale development proposal and evaluate a land-use plan.

Licence 

GHGProof is licensed under a Creative Commons Attribution-NonCommercial-ShareAlike 3.0 Unported License.

Municipalities where GHGProof has been used 

 Abbotsford
 View Royal
 Fraser Valley Regional District
 Capital Regional District
 North Cowichan
 Kent, British Columbia
 University of British Columbia
 Port Clements
 Village of Queen Charlotte
 Masset
 Chilliwack
 Salt Spring Island
 Lasqueti Island
 North Saanich
 Comox, BC
 Hope, British Columbia
 Sunshine Coast Regional District

References

Official page 

GHGProof from Sustainability Solutions Group

Environment of Canada
Greenhouse gas emissions